Sniffles is an animated cartoon and comic-book mouse character in the Warner Bros. Merrie Melodies and Looney Tunes series of cartoons and comics.

Character biography
Director Chuck Jones created Sniffles as a potential new star for the studio in 1939. The character was designed by Disney veteran Charles Thorson, an old hand at designing cute characters for Disney's Silly Symphonies. Thorson's design was highly derivative of a character he had designed for Disney, Abner Countrymouse from the Oscar-winning short The Country Cousin (1936). Both Abner and Sniffles are, in a word, cute. Sniffles' head is almost as large as his body, which allows his infant-like face to dominate his look. He has large, baby-like eyes, a small bewhiskered nose, and a perpetual smile. His ears grow from the sides of his head, placed so as to hearken more to a human infant than to Disney's top star, Mickey Mouse. The character wears a blue sailor cap, a red shirt, blue pants, a yellow scarf, white gloves and tan shoes. His fur is brown with light markings on the face.

Jones debuted the character in the short Naughty but Mice (1939) which has similarities to The Country Cousin though Sniffles has nearly identical traits to the hero kitten in the short The Night Watchman (1938). In Naughty but Mice, Sniffles has a cold and is searching for a remedy. He eventually stumbles upon an alcoholic cold medicine, drinks it, and becomes intoxicated. He then pals around with an electric shaver, which eventually saves him from a hungry cat. Sniffles was played by voice actresses Margaret Hill-Talbot and Marjorie Tarlton.

Jones went on to direct 12 cartoons featuring Sniffles, most of which showcase the naïveté of Sniffles by placing him in a dangerous world. For example, in Sniffles Takes a Trip (1940), a simple drive into the country turns into a nightmare as Sniffles is constantly frightened and awed by his surroundings. Some of Sniffles' films pair him with a bookworm character who accompanies the mouse into a sort of fantasyland where books and toys come to life, such as Toy Trouble (1941). Others simply focus on the inescapable sweetness of the character.

In Bedtime for Sniffles (1940), for example, he struggles to stay awake into the wee hours on Christmas Eve in order to glimpse Santa Claus (which of course never happens). This scene is a showcase for Jones' facility of realizing character through facial expression.

By the end of the series, Jones transformed Sniffles into an incessant chatterbox who serves more as a nuisance than a cute protagonist. For example, in The Unbearable Bear (1943), Sniffles foils a robbery attempt by perpetually pestering the perpetrator. Jones was moving out of his Disney-esque stage in the late 1940s, and Sniffles was retired in 1946 as the director took to more hilarious and sadistic characters such as the Three Bears, fellow mice Hubie and Bertie, Marvin the Martian, and Wile E. Coyote and Road Runner. The mouse's final cartoon was Hush My Mouse (his only entry in the Looney Tunes series) in 1946.

Sniffles quickly faded into obscurity in the animation arena. However, he would find new life in the Looney Tunes and Merrie Melodies Comics begun in 1940 by Dell Comics (writer Chase Craig used several minor Warner Bros. characters to fill pages). These comics teamed Sniffles with a little girl named Mary Jane who could shrink herself to mouse size, originally by sprinkling magic sand borrowed from the Sandman. Throughout most of the series, she could shrink just by reciting "First I close my eyes real tight / Then I wish with all my might / Magic words of poof poof piffles / Make me just as small as Sniffles." By now Sniffles had lost most of his animated film personality and was just a companion to Mary Jane as she explored something found in a garden or entered a sort of magical toyland. Mary Jane soon surpassed the mouse in popularity, and she got top billing in later issues. Artist Roger Armstrong drew the series until Al Hubbard took over in the 1950s. These adventures proved a favorite with readers, and the series continued until 1961. This series was recently resurrected for a story in issue #140 of the current Looney Tunes comic book published by DC Comics.

With the exception of Naughty but Mice, every cartoon in the Sniffles series was given a Blue Ribbon reissue. All 12 Sniffles cartoons are available uncut and fully restored on Looney Tunes Mouse Chronicles: The Chuck Jones Collection DVD and Blu-ray set.

Legacy
The 1990 television series Tiny Toon Adventures features a younger counterpart to Sniffles named Li'l Sneezer, a baby mouse with a propensity for having hurricane-force sneezes.

Sniffles also has a cameo in the movie Space Jam voiced by Colleen Wainwright. He was seen playing for the Looney Tunes team where he was squashed flat by one of the Monstars after he began to chat very quickly and very annoyingly to one of them.

Sniffles appears in The Sylvester & Tweety Mysteries voiced by Kath Soucie. In the episode "The Tail End", he was depicted as a scientifically created Manx mouse with no tail, and unlike his other appearances in this episode he does not wear any clothes (except for a cap.)

Sniffles most recently appeared in the New Looney Tunes segments "DarkBat", "Bonjour, DarkBat" and "Smoothie Operator" voiced again by Kath Soucie. He is shown to have a superhero alter-ego called DarkBat (voiced by Daran Norris) who is a parody of Batman.

Sniffles appears in Bugs Bunny Builders where he is voiced by Dawson Griffin and is depicted as a child.

Filmography
 Naughty but Mice (1939)
 Little Brother Rat (1939)
 Sniffles and the Bookworm (1939)
 Sniffles Takes a Trip (1940)
 The Egg Collector (1940)
 Bedtime for Sniffles (1940)
 Sniffles Bells the Cat (1941)
 Toy Trouble (1941)
 The Brave Little Bat (1941)
 The Unbearable Bear (1943)
 Lost and Foundling (1944)
 Hush My Mouse (1946)

References

External links
Sniffles at Don Markstein's Toonopedia. Archived from the original on February 15, 2016.
"Mary Jane and Sniffles" at Don Markstein's Toonopedia. Archived from the original on February 15, 2016.
All about Sniffles on Chuck Jones Official Website.

Fictional mice and rats
Looney Tunes characters
Film characters introduced in 1939
Male characters in animation